Robert Emmett O'Connor (March 18, 1885 – September 4, 1962) was an Irish-American actor. He appeared in more than 200 films between 1919 and 1950. He is probably best remembered as the warmhearted bootlegger Paddy Ryan in The Public Enemy (1931) and as Detective Sergeant Henderson pursuing the Marx Brothers in A Night at the Opera (1935). He also appeared as Jonesy (the older Paramount gate guard) in Billy Wilder's 1950 film Sunset Boulevard. He also made an appearance at the very beginning and very end of the Metro-Goldwyn-Mayer cartoon short Who Killed Who? (1943).

Selected filmography

Pay Your Dues (1919 short)
His Royal Slyness (1920 short) (uncredited)
Never Weaken (1921 short) (uncredited)
Tin Gods (1926) - Second Foreman
The Love of Sunya (1927) - Detective with Umbrella (uncredited)
The Noose (1928) - Jim Conley
Dressed to Kill (1928) - Detective Gilroy
Four Walls (1928) - Sullivan
The Singing Fool (1928) - Cafe Owner, Bill
Freedom of the Press (1928) - Boss Maloney
Weary River (1929) - Police Sergeant (uncredited)
The Office Scandal (1929) - Judge (uncredited)
Smiling Irish Eyes (1929) - Sir Timothy
The Isle of Lost Ships (1929) - Jackson
In the Next Room (1930) - Tim Morel
Framed (1930) - Sergeant Schultze
Alias French Gertie (1930) - Detective Kelcey
The Big Fight (1930) - Detective
The Big House (1930) - Donlin
Our Blushing Brides (1930) - The Detective
Shooting Straight (1930) - Detective Hagen
Up the River (1930) - Prison Warden (uncredited)
Man to Man (1930) - Sheriff
Paid (1930) - Police Sergeant Cassidy
The Single Sin (1931) - Detective
Three Girls Lost (1931) - Detective (uncredited)
The Public Enemy (1931) - Paddy Ryan
Up for Murder (1931) - Detective Malone (uncredited)
Three Who Loved (1931) - Police Lieutenant Tom Rooney
The Public Defender (1931) - Detective Brady
Fanny Foley Herself (1931) - Burns
Reckless Living (1931) -Ryan
Ladies of the Big House (1931) - Detective Martin French (uncredited)
Two Kinds of Women (1932) - Tim Gohagen
Taxi! (1932) - Cop with Jewish Man (uncredited)
The Final Edition (1932) - Police Lieutenant Daniels
The Beast of the City (1932) - Booking Policeman (uncredited)
The Big Timer (1932) - Dan Wilson
Play Girl (1932) - Police Sergeant (uncredited)
 The Arm of the Law (1932) - Detective Captain Blake
Night World (1932) - The Policeman
Week-End Marriage (1932) - Eddie - Police Desk Clerk (uncredited)
The Dark Horse (1932) - Sheriff
American Madness (1932) - Inspector
Blessed Event (1932) - Jim - Police Detective (uncredited)
Blonde Venus (1932) - Dan O'Connor
The Kid from Spain (1932) - Detective Crawford
Frisco Jenny (1932) - Sandoval
The Great Jasper (1933) - Kelly (uncredited)
Mystery of the Wax Museum (1933) - Joe - Cop (uncredited)
Gabriel Over the White House (1933) - Corrupt Police Inspector (uncredited)
Picture Snatcher (1933) - Lt. Nolan
Bed of Roses (1933) - River Boat Captain Scroggins (uncredited)
Midnight Mary (1933) - Charlie - the Cop
Don't Bet on Love (1933) - Edward Shelton
The Big Brain (1933) - Detective (uncredited)
Lady for a Day (1933) - Inspector
Penthouse (1933) - Stevens
The Big Shakedown (1934) - Regan - Bartender
Bottoms Up (1934) - Detective Rooney
Return of the Terror (1934) - Inspector Bradley
A Wicked Woman (1934) - Dugan (uncredited)
The Mysterious Mr. Wong (1934) - Officer 'Mac' McGillicuddy
The Whole Town's Talking (1935) - Police Lt. Mack (uncredited)
Princess O'Hara (1935) - Gillicudy (uncredited)
Star of Midnight (1935) - Police Sgt. Cleary
Stolen Harmony (1935) - Warden Clark (uncredited)
Let 'Em Have It (1935) - Police Captain
Diamond Jim (1935) - Brady's Father (uncredited)
Waterfront Lady (1935) - Police Lieutenant
A Night at the Opera (1935) - Police Sergeant Henderson
Coronado (1935) - Hotel Policeman (uncredited)
White Lies (1935) - Capt. McHenry (uncredited)
The Lone Wolf Returns (1935) - Detective Benson
It Had to Happen (1936) - Policeman (scenes deleted)
Little Lord Fauntleroy (1936) - Policeman
Kelly the Second (1936) - Policeman Joe (uncredited)
Jailbreak (1936) - Policeman (uncredited)
Sinner Take All (1936) - Police Capt. Greenwood (uncredited)
Sing Me a Love Song (1936) - Detective (uncredited)
We Who Are About to Die (1937) - Detective Mitchell
Girl Overboard (1937) - Sergeant Hatton
When You're in Love (1937) - Assistant Immigration Officer (uncredited)
The Crime Nobody Saw (1937) - Officer Tim Harrigan
Her Husband Lies (1937) - Bartender (uncredited)
Park Avenue Logger (1937) - Police Sergeant
Waikiki Wedding (1937) - Policeman (uncredited)
A Star Is Born (1937) - Santa Anita Clubhouse Bartender (uncredited)
The Frame-Up (1937) - Larry Mann aka John Mench
The Last Train from Madrid (1937) - Secret Service Man (uncredited)
Riding on Air (1937) - Detective Flynn (uncredited)
New Faces of 1937 (1937) - Policeman (uncredited)
Super-Sleuth (1937) - Casey
Big City (1937) - Comet Cab Driver (scenes deleted)
Trapped by G-Men (1937) - Federal Agent Jim
Boy of the Streets (1937) - Police Officer Rourke
Wells Fargo (1937) - Sea Captain (uncredited)
Professor Beware (1938) - Cop at Estate (uncredited)
Made for Each Other (1939) - Harry - Elevator Starter (uncredited)
You Can't Get Away with Murder (1939) - First Detective (uncredited)
Sergeant Madden (1939) - Capt. Crane (uncredited)
The Streets of New York (1939) - Police Officer Burke
Joe and Ethel Turp Call on the President (1939) - Pat Donegan
The Lone Wolf Strikes (1940) - House Detective (uncredited)
Double Alibi (1940) - Patrolman Delaney
I Take This Oath (1940) - Police Car Driver (uncredited)
Hot Steel (1940) - Police Inspector
A Fugitive from Justice (1940) - Murphy
Dance, Girl, Dance (1940) - Plainclothesman at Palais Royale (uncredited)
No Time for Comedy (1940) - Desk Sergeant (uncredited)
Tight Shoes (1941) - Honest John Beebe
Fiesta Time (1941) - Bus Driver (uncredited)
Maisie Gets Her Man (1942) - Benefit Stage Manager (uncredited)
Jackass Mail (1942) - Peter Lawson (uncredited)
Pierre of the Plains (1942) - Magistrate Lowry (uncredited)
Tish (1942) - Game Warden (uncredited)
The Omaha Trail (1942) - Oxen Owner (uncredited)
Tennessee Johnson (1942) - Robinson (uncredited)
Andy Hardy's Double Life (1942) - Train Conductor (uncredited)
The Human Comedy (1943) - Bartender (uncredited)
Harrigan's Kid (1943) - Murphy (uncredited)
Slightly Dangerous (1943) - Reporter (uncredited)
Air Raid Wardens (1943) - Charlie Beaugart
Dr. Gillespie's Criminal Case (1943) - Samson (uncredited)
Best Foot Forward (1943) - Train Conductor (uncredited)
Young Ideas (1943) - Train Conductor (uncredited)
Swing Shift Maisie (1943) - Proprietor (uncredited)
Lost Angel (1943) - Policeman (uncredited)
Whistling in Brooklyn (1943) - Detective Leo Finnigan
Rationing (1944) - Sheriff McGuiness (uncredited)
Broadway Rhythm (1944) - Stage Manager (uncredited)
Meet the People (1944) - Theatre Attendant (uncredited)
Barbary Coast Gent (1944) - Joe - Bartender (uncredited)
An American Romance (1944) - Open Pit Irish Foreman (uncredited)
The Thin Man Goes Home (1944) - Baggage Attendant on Train (uncredited)
Meet Me in St. Louis (1944) - Motorman (uncredited)
Nothing but Trouble (1944) - Police Officer Mulligan (uncredited)
Music for Millions (1944) - Policeman (uncredited)
Gentle Annie (1944) - Childers - Bartender
Main Street After Dark (1945) - Policeman (uncredited)
The Clock (1945) - Policeman (uncredited)
Anchors Aweigh (1945) - Cop (uncredited)
Abbott and Costello in Hollywood (1945) - 2nd Studio Guard (uncredited)
They Were Expendable (1945) - Silver Dollar Bartender (uncredited)
Adventure (1945) - Man in Cantina (uncredited)
The Harvey Girls (1946) - Conductor (uncredited)
Up Goes Maisie (1946) - Rose Bowl Watchman (uncredited)
A Letter for Evie (1946) - Mr. Clancy (uncredited)
The Hoodlum Saint (1946) - Police Desk Sergeant (uncredited)
Cuban Pete (1946) - Cuban Servant (uncredited)
Boys' Ranch (1946) - Druggist
Courage of Lassie (1946) - Deputy (uncredited)
Three Wise Fools (1946) - Chief of Police (uncredited)
Undercurrent (1946) - Stationmaster (uncredited)
Till the Clouds Roll By (1946) - Ed (uncredited)
The Show-Off (1946) - Motorman (uncredited)
The Mighty McGurk (1947) - Bartender (uncredited)
Trail Street (1947) - Drunk (uncredited)
High Barbaree (1947) - Stationmaster (uncredited)
Honeymoon (1947) - Gardener (uncredited)
Living in a Big Way (1947) - Bailiff (uncredited)
The Hucksters (1947) - Frank - Hotel Doorman (uncredited)
The Romance of Rosy Ridge (1947) - Southerner (uncredited)
The Unfinished Dance (1947) - Mr. Brown - an Engineer (uncredited)
Merton of the Movies (1947) - Mac - Restaurant Counterman (uncredited)
High Wall (1947) - Joe (uncredited)
Alias a Gentleman (1948) - Doorman (uncredited)
Tenth Avenue Angel (1948) - Mr. O'Callan (uncredited)
The Bride Goes Wild (1948) - Conductor (uncredited)
B.F.'s Daughter (1948) - Conductor (uncredited)
Easter Parade (1948) - Policeman (uncredited)
Sunset Boulevard (1950) - Jonesy - Older Paramount Gate Guard (uncredited)
Watch the Birdie (1950) - Policeman (uncredited)

References

External links

1885 births
1962 deaths
American male film actors
American male silent film actors
Male actors from Milwaukee
20th-century American male actors